Montottone is a comune (municipality) in the Province of Fermo in the Italian region Marche, located about  south of Ancona and about  north of Ascoli Piceno.

Montottone borders the following municipalities: Belmonte Piceno, Grottazzolina, Monsampietro Morico, Monte Giberto, Monte Rinaldo, Monte Vidon Combatte, Ortezzano.

References

External links
 Official website
 Montottone Tourist Information Italy

Cities and towns in the Marche